Muttom is a village in the Kanyakumari District of the Tamil Nadu, India. It is a well known its beach with some rocks and caves. The major occupation of people in Muttom is fishing. Muttom village is attracted by visitors because of its beach. More than hundreds of people come to the beach every day and spending their time on the beach shore. This beach is known as the best sun set point in the district. Muttom harbor work has been under construction for last 3 years and was expected to be completed before end of 2014.

Geography
Muttom is one of the fishing villages, located 16 km from the capital town Nagercoil. It is well connected by road to the Nagercoil town. It is approximately 75 km from the Trivandrum International Airport. It is reachable from Kanyakumari by road with a distance of about 34 km. The nearest villages are Esanthangu, Ammandivillai, Pillaithoppu, Azhikal, Kadiyapattanam and Manavala Kurichi. Major roads reach Muttom via Ammandivillai, Esanthangu and Nagercoil.
There is a  lighthouse which was constructed by British India. The structure was built when India was part of the British Empire until 1947.

Demographics
More than 99% of the village are Christians and they do a variety of jobs. Majority of the people are fishermen who do fishing related works. Most of the people are educated at least to the school level. As most of the residents are Catholics, it has a catholic administration committee which is elected democratically and headed by the parish priest of the All Saints Church.

The Thirunanthikarai Cave Temple is one of the founding stones of the Jain religion. Currently the Thirunanthikarai Cave Temple is under the purview and care of Archaeological Survey of India. According to research, in 1003 AD, King Raja Raja Chola celebrated his birthday here. He conquered Muttom, and named Mummudi Chola Nalloor as stated in the stone carvings available in the temple. Around the eighth century AD an ascetic named Veeranandi came from Thirunarunkondai Melappalli and stayed here to preach Jainism.

Education
Muttom has a primary school (St. John's primary school), managed by the catholic parish priest of Muttom and headed by the senior most teacher as Headmaster. There also is a higher secondary school by the name of All Saints Higher Secondary School and is managed by the Monfort Brothers. This school has long standing records in both sports and academics. There is a B.Ed college named after Bishop Agneswamy is also established recently and more educational institutions are expected in the coming years. English medium school namely the Model English School, provides a quality education to the children of Muttom as well as neighbouring villages, which is really a benefit to the small fishing villages.

Light House
Muttom has a light house, constructed by the British in colonial times. As recorded in international shipping charts, the lighthouse is situated 110 ft ( 34 m) above sea level . The Skelton was built when India was part of the British Empire until 1947. The British Government started lighthouse construction in 1857 and completed the work in 1882. The Lighthouse is now open for visitors, with 4-5000 visitors each year. A nominal entry fee of Rs.10 is charged for Adults and Rs.3 for students under age 12. Entry is free for School students in uniform.

Beach
Muttom sports a tidy beach. Huge rocks standing at either sides of the beach give the beach a pristine look. There is a children's park nearby.

Transport
Buses serving this village :
 From Nagercoil 5C, 14A, 14C, 14DV,14EV,5F, 
 From Thuckalay and Monday Market (alias Thingalchanthai or Thingalnagar) 47,47C,12G,46C
 From Kadiapattanam
14A, 14C, 14F, 46C, 47C
 From James Nager 14DV
 From kanyakumari SSS
 From Marthandam 46C
 From Ramanthurai 9k
 From Colachel 5C,SSS,9K,5F,14F
Nearest Rail Head

 Eraniel - 10 km a small crossing station
 Nagercoil - 18 km Junction Station for trains to all parts of India.

Nearest Airport

 Trivandrum (Thiruvananthapuram) 72 km by road

Nearest Seaport

 Muttom - Fishing Harbour
 
 Tuticorin (Thoothukudi) - 120 km Cargo Ship international/domestic, plans to ply passenger ships between Sri Lanka and India

Main town : Nagercoil for all kinds of accommodation and shopping. Just a 17 km away from Muttom.

References

External links

 Web Portal of Muttom by Bede Griffiths Charitable Trusts 
 

Villages in Kanyakumari district